Sadir or Sadeer may refer to:

 Salih Sadeer, Iraqi footballer
 'Sadeer attam', the ancient name of Bharata Natyam, an Indian classical dance
 Sadir (or Gamma Cygni), a star in the northern constellation Cygnus

Arabic-language surnames